Hiram N. Moulton (August 14, 1818 – August 28, 1899) was mayor of Madison, Wisconsin.

Biography
Moulton was born on August 14, 1818, in East Hartford, Connecticut, the eldest of twelve children. Moulton moved to Madison in 1854. He married Ellen Cook. They also owned a home in Burke, Wisconsin. Moulton worked as a contractor and helped construct the Wisconsin State Capitol. He was later appointed State Carpenter of Wisconsin by Governor George Wilbur Peck. Moulton died of liver cancer on August 28, 1899.

Political career
Moulton was mayor of Madison from 1885 to 1886. Previously, he was an alderman.

References

People from East Hartford, Connecticut
People from Burke, Wisconsin
Wisconsin city council members
Mayors of Madison, Wisconsin
1818 births
1899 deaths
19th-century American politicians